Andre Purlette (born 4 November 1973) is a Guyanese former professional boxer who competed from 1992 to 2009. Known as "Tombstone", Purlette turned pro in 1992 and won his first 32 bouts, including a victory over Jimmy Thunder. He later lost to veteran Jeremy Williams in 2003 and KOd by Aaron Williams in 2008.

His professional career began when he was 19, on Boxing Day 1992, with a first round knockout of Alberto Ellis at the National Park. He went undefeated until 2002, when he was knocked out in round five of a heavyweight fight against 27-year-old Eliecer Castillo at American Airlines Arena on January 4, 2002.

Pulette won the World Boxing Council Latino heavyweight title with a TKO victory over Crawford Grimsley on September 7, 2002 in Prague. He made five more wins before two loses against Aaron Williams and Harold Sconiers.

He retired in 2009 and moved to the US.

Since then, he was inducted into the Stabroek News Boxing Hall of Fame.

Professional boxing record

|-
|align="center" colspan=8|40 Wins (35 knockouts), 4 Losses
|-
| align="center" style="border-style: none none solid solid; background: #e3e3e3"|Result
| align="center" style="border-style: none none solid solid; background: #e3e3e3"|Record
| align="center" style="border-style: none none solid solid; background: #e3e3e3"|Opponent
| align="center" style="border-style: none none solid solid; background: #e3e3e3"|Type
| align="center" style="border-style: none none solid solid; background: #e3e3e3"|Round
| align="center" style="border-style: none none solid solid; background: #e3e3e3"|Date
| align="center" style="border-style: none none solid solid; background: #e3e3e3"|Location
| align="center" style="border-style: none none solid solid; background: #e3e3e3"|Notes
|-align=center
|Loss
|
|align=left| Harold Sconiers
|TKO
|3
|24/10/2009
|align=left| Charlotte, North Carolina, U.S.
|align=left|
|-
|Loss
|
|align=left| Aaron Williams
|TKO
|2
|04/04/2008
|align=left| Lincoln, Rhode Island, U.S.
|align=left|
|-
|Win
|
|align=left| Andrew Greeley
|UD
|6
|06/12/2007
|align=left| Bronx, New York, U.S.
|align=left|
|-
|Win
|
|align=left| Darnell Wilson
|UD
|6
|30/06/2007
|align=left| Hollywood, Florida, U.S.
|align=left|
|-
|Win
|
|align=left| Sam Tillman
|KO
|2
|09/07/2005
|align=left| Pompano Beach, Florida, U.S.
|align=left|
|-
|Win
|
|align=left| Lionel Butler
|TKO
|2
|09/09/2003
|align=left| Miami, Florida, U.S.
|align=left|
|-
|Win
|
|align=left| Ron Guerrero
|TKO
|1
|02/08/2003
|align=left| Walker, Minnesota, U.S.
|align=left|
|-
|Loss
|
|align=left| Jeremy Williams

|UD
|10
|10/06/2003
|align=left| Corpus Christi, Texas, U.S.
|align=left|
|-
|Win
|
|align=left| Wade Lewis
|KO
|2
|06/03/2003
|align=left| Miami, Florida, U.S.
|align=left|
|-
|Win
|
|align=left| Crawford Grimsley
|TKO
|3
|07/09/2002
|align=left| Prague, Czech Republic
|align=left|
|-
|Win
|
|align=left| Joe Lenhart
|TKO
|5
|25/05/2002
|align=left| Tampa, Florida, U.S.
|align=left|
|-
|Loss
|
|align=left| Elieser Castillo
|KO
|5
|04/01/2002
|align=left| Miami, Florida, U.S.
|align=left|
|-
|Win
|
|align=left| Jeremy Bates
|TKO
|2
|05/10/2001
|align=left| Miami Beach, Florida, U.S.
|align=left|
|-
|Win
|
|align=left| Jimmy Thunder
|TKO
|2
|06/07/2001
|align=left| Reno, Nevada, U.S.
|align=left|
|-
|Win
|
|align=left| Muhammad Raheem
|TKO
|3
|01/05/2001
|align=left| Memphis, Tennessee, U.S.
|align=left|
|-
|Win
|
|align=left| Craig Payne
|TKO
|2
|10/02/2001
|align=left| Miami, Florida, U.S.
|align=left|
|-
|Win
|
|align=left| Garing Lane
|PTS
|6
|12/08/2000
|align=left| Miami, Florida, U.S.
|align=left|
|-
|Win
|
|align=left| Onebo Maxime
|TKO
|3
|29/07/2000
|align=left| Tunica, Mississippi, U.S.
|align=left|
|-
|Win
|
|align=left| Louis Gallucci
|KO
|1
|23/06/2000
|align=left| Tampa, Florida, U.S.
|align=left|
|-
|Win
|
|align=left| Charlie Dean Moore
|TKO
|4
|18/06/1999
|align=left| Ocala, Florida, U.S.
|align=left|
|-
|Win
|
|align=left| Andre Sherrod
|KO
|1
|21/05/1999
|align=left| Greensboro, North Carolina, U.S.
|align=left|
|-
|Win
|
|align=left| Fred Houpe
|TKO
|2
|05/12/1998
|align=left| Miami, Florida, U.S.
|align=left|
|-
|Win
|
|align=left| Cliff Nellon
|UD
|4
|16/10/1998
|align=left| Fort Lauderdale, Florida, U.S.
|align=left|
|-
|Win
|
|align=left| Jeff Williams
|KO
|8
|15/11/1997
|align=left| Lake Worth, Florida, U.S.
|align=left|
|-
|Win
|
|align=left| Ken Moody
|TKO
|2
|09/08/1997
|align=left| Homestead, Florida, U.S.
|align=left|
|-
|Win
|
|align=left| Frankie Hines
|KO
|2
|29/07/1997
|align=left| Nashville, Tennessee, U.S.
|align=left|
|-
|Win
|
|align=left| Ed Mosley
|TKO
|3
|25/04/1997
|align=left| Miami, Florida, U.S.
|align=left|
|-
|Win
|
|align=left| Kenneth Myers
|TKO
|3
|10/04/1997
|align=left| Norfolk, Virginia, U.S.
|align=left|
|-
|Win
|
|align=left| Oscar Silva
|TKO
|1
|14/03/1997
|align=left| Miami, Florida, U.S.
|align=left|
|-
|Win
|
|align=left| Ken McCurdy
|KO
|1
|21/02/1997
|align=left| Miami, Florida, U.S.
|align=left|
|-
|Win
|
|align=left| Elton Singleton
|TKO
|4
|23/11/1996
|align=left| Homestead, Florida, U.S.
|align=left|
|-
|Win
|
|align=left| Bill Medei
|KO
|1
|30/08/1996
|align=left| Miami, Florida, U.S.
|align=left|
|-
|Win
|
|align=left| Stanley Hughey
|KO
|1
|29/07/1996
|align=left| Hallandale, Florida, U.S.
|align=left|
|-
|Win
|
|align=left| Willie Driver
|TKO
|5
|26/04/1996
|align=left| Miami, Florida, U.S.
|align=left|
|-
|Win
|
|align=left| Fred Adams
|TKO
|2
|26/03/1996
|align=left| Immokalee, Florida, U.S.
|align=left|
|-
|Win
|
|align=left| David Fields
|TKO
|3
|25/02/1995
|align=left| Georgetown, Guyana
|align=left|
|-
|Win
|
|align=left| Faustino Gonzalez
|KO
|2
|16/10/1994
|align=left| Georgetown, Guyana
|align=left|
|-
|Win
|
|align=left| Tim St Clair
|KO
|2
|26/06/1994
|align=left| Georgetown, Guyana
|align=left|
|-
|Win
|
|align=left| George Allison
|TKO
|8
|22/02/1994
|align=left| Georgetown, Guyana
|align=left|
|-
|Win
|
|align=left| Ivor Simmons
|TKO
|2
|07/11/1993
|align=left| Georgetown, Guyana
|align=left|
|-
|Win
|
|align=left| Vidal Rawlins
|DQ
|4
|01/10/1993
|align=left| Georgetown, Guyana
|align=left|
|-
|Win
|
|align=left| Colin Murray
|TKO
|1
|18/09/1993
|align=left| Georgetown, Guyana
|align=left|
|-
|Win
|
|align=left| Leon O'Neal
|TKO
|1
|28/02/1993
|align=left| Georgetown, Guyana
|align=left|
|-
|Win
|
|align=left| Alberto Ellis
|KO
|1
|26/12/1992
|align=left| Georgetown, Guyana
|align=left|
|}

References

External links 
 
 Article mentioning Purlette Archived at landofsixpeoples.come

1973 births
Living people
Heavyweight boxers
Sportspeople from Georgetown, Guyana
Guyanese male boxers
Cruiserweight boxers